This is a partial list of bridges of Moscow, Russia, including existing rail, road and foot bridges over Moskva River, Moscow Canal, Vodootvodny Canal within the MKAD beltway limits and the bridges over Yauza River downstream from Rostokino.

Listing conventions 

Bridge lists for each river are sorted in downstream order, with type and year of completion of existing bridge. Pairs of adjacent bridges serving the same highway or rail line are listed as single entries, with different completion years separated by commas. Demolished bridges are listed only when no replacements were built on old sites or nearby. Tram service is shown as of December 2006. Many other existing bridges had tram tracks in the past.

Reconstruction years are included, when load-bearing arches, girders and roadway decks were replaced. In these cases, both year of original completion and year or years of reconstruction are given, i.e. Novospassky Bridge, 1911/1938/2000. Replacement or relocation of arches, roadway deck and supporting pillars or foundations qualifies as new construction, as in the case of Pushkinsky Pedestrian Bridge (2000). In case of Komissariatsky Bridge, completion (1927) and opening to regular traffic (1960) are separated by decades; only the earliest year (1927) is listed.

Bridges over Moskva River and Moskva Canal 
Khimkinsky Bridges (Химкинские мосты) over Moskva Canal, road:MKAD, 1997 and 1998
Leningradsky Bridge (Ленинградский мост) over Moskva Canal, road, 1970
Spassky Bridges (Спасские мосты), road:MKAD, 1998 and 1962) not to be confused with downtown Novospassky Bridge
Stroginsky Bridge (Строгинский мост), road, tram, 1982
Moscow-Riga Railroad Bridge over Moskva Canal, rail, 1936
Zhivopisny Bridge (Живописный мост), road, 2007
Khoroshevsky Bridge (Хорошёвский мост) over Moskva River Shortcut, road, 1938
Karamyshevsky Bridge (Карамышевский мост) over Moskva River Shortcut, road, 1937
Krylatsky Bridge (Крылатский мост), road, 1984
Kraspopresnensky Bridge (Краснопресненский мост), road, 1965
Filevsky Rail Bridge (Филевский железнодорожный мост), rail, 1875/1938/1961
Dorogomilovsky Rail Bridge (Дорогомиловский железнодорожный мост), rail, 1907
Dorogomilovsky Road Bridge (Дорогомиловский автодорожный мост),  road:Third Ring, 2000
Bagration Bridge (Мост Багратион), pedestrian, 1997 
Novoarbatsky Bridge (Новоарбатский мост), road, 1957
Smolensky Metro Bridge (Смоленский метромост), subway, 1937
Borodinsky Bridge (Бородинский мост), road, 1912/1952/2001
Bogdan Khmelnitsky (Kievsky) Bridge (Мост Богдана Хмельницкого), foot, 2001
Krasnoluzhsky Rail Bridge (Краснолужский железнодорожный мост), rail, 1907/2001
Krasnoluzhsky Road Bridge (Краснолужский автодорожный мост), road:Third Ring, 1998
Luzhniki Metro Bridge (Лужнецкий метромост), road, subway station, 1958/2001
Andreyevsky Road Bridge (Андреевский автодорожный мост), road:Third Ring, 2000
Andreyevsky Rail Bridge (Андреевский железнодожный мост), rail, 2001
Pushkinsky Bridge (Пушкинский мост), foot, 2000
Krymsky (Crimean) Bridge (Крымский мост), road:Garden Ring, 1938
Demolished and not replaced: Babyegorodskaya Dam (Бабьегородская плотина), 1836
Patriarshy Bridge (Патриарший мост), foot, 2004
Bolshoy Kamenny Bridge (Большой Каменный мост), road, 1938
Bolshoy Moskvoretsky Bridge (Большой Москворецкий мост), road, 1937
Bolshoy Ustinsky Bridge (Большой Устьинский мост), road, tram, 1938
Bolshoy Krasnokholmsky Bridge (Большой Краснохолмский мост), road:Garden Ring, 1938
Novospassky Bridge (Новоспасский мост), road, tram, 1911/1938/2000
Demolished and not replaced: wooden Vsesvyatsky road bridge (road, located between Simonov Monastery and Zhukov Proezd)
Avtozavodsky Bridge (Автозаводский мост), road:Third Ring, 1961. Replaced wooden Danilovsky Bridge (road, tram) that was built after World War I
Danilovsky Rail Bridge (Alekseevsky) (Даниловский (Алексеевский) железнодорожный мост), rail, 1908/1999
Demolished and replaced with reclaimed land: wooden Nagatinsky bridge (near present-day portal of Avtozavodskaya tunnel)
Nagatinsky Metro Bridge (Нагатинский метромост), road, subway, 1969
Saburovsky Rail Bridges (Сабуровские мосты), rail, 1953 and 1924
Brateevsky Bridge (Братеевский мост), road, 1989
Besedinsky Bridges (Бесединские мосты), road:MKAD, 1998 and 1961/1998

Bridges over Vodootvodny Canal 

Maly Kamenny Bridge (Малый Каменный мост), road, 1938
Luzhkov Bridge (Лужков мост), foot, 1994 
Maly Moskvoretsky Bridge (Малый Москворецкий мост), road, 1938
Chugunny Bridge (Чугунный мост), road, 1889/1966
Sadovnichesky Bridge (Садовнический мост), foot, 1963
Komissariatsky Bridge (Комиссариатский мост), road, tram, 1927
Zverev Bridge (Зверев мост), foot, 1930
Maly Krasnokholmsky Bridge (Малый Краснохолмский мост), road:Garden Ring, 1938
Second Schluzovoy Bridge (Второй Шлюзовой мост) official title to be confirmed, foot, 1997
Schluzovoy Bridge (Шлюзовой мост, Sluice bridge), road, 1965

Bridges over Yauza from Rostokino to Moskva River
Rostokinsky Bridges 1 and 2 (1ый и 2ой Ростокинские мосты), tram, road, 1957
Milliony Bridge (Миллионный мост) - see Rostokino Aqueduct
Yaroslavsky Rail Bridge (мост Ярославского направления), rail 
Bogatyrsky Bridge (Богатырский мост), road, tram, 1912
Oleny Bridge (Олений мост), road 
Glebovsky Bridge (Глебовский мост), road, 1981
Preobrazhensky Metro Bridge (Преображенский метромост), subway, 1965
Matrossky Bridge (Матросский мост), road, tram, 1956
Rubtsovsko-Dvortsovy Bridge (Рубцовско-Дворцовый мост), foot
Elektrozavodsky Bridges (Электрозаводские мосты), road, rail, foot 
Rubtsov Bridge (Рубцов мост), foot
Gospitalny Bridge (Госпитальный мост), road, 1941
Lefortovsky Bridge (Лефортовский мост), road, tram, 1777/1940
Third Ring Bridge (Мост ТТК через Яузу), road:Third Ring, 2000
Saltykovsky Bridge (Салтыковский мост), foot
Tamozhenny Bridge (Таможенный мост), foot
Andronikov Bridge (Андроников мост), rail
Kostomarovsky Bridge (Костомаровский мост), road, 1941
Vysokoyauzsky Bridge (Высокояузский мост), road:Garden Ring, 1890/1963
Tessinsky Bridge (Тессинский мост), foot
Astakhovsky (Yauzsky) Bridge (Астаховский (Яузский) мост), road, 1938
Maly Ustinsky Bridge (Малый Устьинский мост), road, 1938

Other notable bridges, dams, locks and aqueducts
Gorbaty Bridge over Presnya (Горбатый мост), memorial, 1806/1986
Rostokino Aqueduct over Yauza (Ростокинский акведук), 1780-1804
Setunski Bridge over Setun (Сетуньский мост), road, 1953
Tushino Canal Tunnel (canal, road, tram, 1937) 
Pererva Dam (Перервинская плотина), 1932-1937
Karamyshevskaya Dam (Карамышевская плотина), 1932-1937
Yauza Locks

References

External links

Moscow bridges Photographs of Moscow bridges and views from them

Bridges in Moscow
Moscow
Moscow
Bridges, Moscow
Bridges